Jón Ingi Guðmundsson (16 September 1909 – 5 May 1989) was an Icelandic water polo player. He competed in the men's tournament at the 1936 Summer Olympics.

References

1909 births
1989 deaths
Icelandic male water polo players
Olympic water polo players of Iceland
Water polo players at the 1936 Summer Olympics